Anton D. Strouf (November 19, 1884 – August 27, 1940) was an American politician and attorney who served as a member of the Wisconsin State Assembly and Montana Senate.

Early life and education 
Born in the town of Kossuth, Wisconsin, Strouf graduated from the Manitowoc County Rural Normal School. Strouf graduated from the University of Chicago Law School and was admitted to the State Bar of Wisconsin. Strouf also took postgraduate courses at the University of Wisconsin–Madison.

Career 
Strouf began his career as an educator. Strouf then served as a Democratic member of the Wisconsin State Assembly in 1920. After earning his J.D. degree, Strouf practiced law in Great Falls, Montana and served as a member of the Montana State Senate in 1920, but resigned shortly after and sold his law practice. In 1921, Strouf returned to Manitowoc, Wisconsin and continued to practice law.

Death 
In 1940, Strouf committed suicide at a hotel in Manitowoc, Wisconsin.

Notes

1884 births
1940 deaths
Politicians from Great Falls, Montana
People from Kossuth, Wisconsin
University of Chicago Law School alumni
Montana lawyers
Wisconsin lawyers
Democratic Party Montana state senators
Democratic Party members of the Wisconsin State Assembly
American politicians who committed suicide
Suicides by firearm in Wisconsin
20th-century American politicians
People from Manitowoc, Wisconsin
20th-century American lawyers